Holopogon is a genus of robber flies in the family Asilidae. There are at least 60 described species in Holopogon.

Species
These 67 species belong to the genus Holopogon:

 Holopogon acropennis Martin, 1959 i c g
 Holopogon albipilosus Curran, 1923 i c g
 Holopogon albosetosus Schiner, 1867 c g
 Holopogon angustifacies Lehr, 1972 c g
 Holopogon appendiculatum (Bigot, 1878) c g
 Holopogon atrifrons Cole, 1924 i c g
 Holopogon atripennis Back, 1909 i c g
 Holopogon auribarbis (Meigen, 1820) c g
 Holopogon avor Lehr, 1972 c g
 Holopogon binotatus Loew, 1870 c g
 Holopogon brunnipes (Meigen, 1820) c g
 Holopogon bullatus Wulp, 1882 c g
 Holopogon caesariatus Martin, 1959 i c g
 Holopogon chalcogaster (Dufour, 1850) c g
 Holopogon claripennis (Loew, 1856) c g
 Holopogon cognatus Richter, 1964 c g
 Holopogon cornutus Theodor, 1980 c g
 Holopogon crinitus Martin, 1959 i c g
 Holopogon currani Martin, 1959 i c g
 Holopogon dichromatopus Bezzi, 1926 c g
 Holopogon dimidiatus (Meigen, 1820) c g
 Holopogon dolicharista Lehr, 1972 c g
 Holopogon dusmetii Strobl, 1909 c g
 Holopogon fisheri Martin, 1967 c g
 Holopogon flavescens Jaennicke, 1867 c g
 Holopogon flavotibialis Strobl, 1909 c g
 Holopogon fugax Loew, 1858 c g
 Holopogon fumipennis (Meigen, 1820) c g
 Holopogon guttulus (Wiedemann, 1821) i c g
 Holopogon imbecillus Loew, 1871 c g
 Holopogon japonicus Nagatomi, 1983 c g
 Holopogon kirgizorum Peck, 1977 c g
 Holopogon kirtshenkoi Lehr, 1972 c g
 Holopogon kugleri Theodor, 1980 c g
 Holopogon melaleucus (Meigen, 1820) c g
 Holopogon melas (Dufour, 1852) c g
 Holopogon mica Martin, 1967 i c g b
 Holopogon mingusae Martin, 1959 i c g
 Holopogon negrus Lehr, 1972 c g
 Holopogon ni Tomasovic, 2006 c g
 Holopogon nigrifacies Bezzi, 1900 c g
 Holopogon nigripennis (Meigen, 1820) c g
 Holopogon nigropilosus Theodor, 1980 c g
 Holopogon nitidiventris (Bigot, 1878) c g
 Holopogon nitidus (Macquart, 1849) c g
 Holopogon niveoscutum Hull, 1967 c g
 Holopogon nobilis Loew, 1869 c g
 Holopogon oriens Martin, 1959 i c g b
 Holopogon phaeonotus Loew, 1874 i c g b
 Holopogon priscus (Meigen, 1820) c g
 Holopogon pulcher Williston, 1901 c g
 Holopogon pusillus (Macquart, 1838) c g
 Holopogon quadrinotatus Seguy, 1953 c g
 Holopogon rugiventris Strobl, 1906 c g
 Holopogon sapphirus Martin, 1967 i c g
 Holopogon seniculus Loew, 1866 i c g b
 Holopogon siculus (Macquart, 1834) c g
 Holopogon snowi Back, 1909 i c g b
 Holopogon stellatus Martin, 1959 i c g
 Holopogon tenerum Bigot, 1878 c g
 Holopogon tomentosus Oldroyd, 1974 c g
 Holopogon turkmenicus Lehr, 1972 c g
 Holopogon umbrinus Back, 1909 i c g
 Holopogon venustus (Rossi, 1790) c g
 Holopogon vockerothi Martin, 1959 i c g
 Holopogon vumba Oldroyd, 1974 c g
 Holopogon wilcoxi Martin, 1959 i c g b

Data sources: i = ITIS, c = Catalogue of Life, g = GBIF, b = Bugguide.net

References

Further reading

External links

 
 
 

Asilidae genera